Lakeland is a neighborhood of Louisville, Kentucky located along LaGrange Road near Central State Hospital and Keeneland, Lyndon, Kentucky.

References

Neighborhoods in Louisville, Kentucky